Mohlunke, is a village in Wazirabad Tehsil, Gujranwala District, Punjab, Pakistan.

Education 
 Government Boys Primary School Mohlanke
 Government Girls Primary School Mohlanke

See also

 Gujranwala
 Ahmad Nagar

References

Villages in Gujranwala District
Populated places in Wazirabad Tehsil